Battle of Basra may refer to:

 Battle of the Camel (656), conflict over succession to the caliphate
 Battle of Basra (871), Zanj capture of Basra
 Battle of Basra (1914), British capture Basra from the Ottoman Empire in Mesopotamian campaign
 Basra offensive (1982), major land battle following expulsion of Iraq from Iran
 Siege of Basra (1987), Iranian siege of Basra
 Battle of Basra (1991), battle between Iraqi forces and Shi’ite militants allied with Iraqi army defectors in the 1991 uprisings in Iraq 
 Battle of Basra (2003), the first major conflict in the 2003 invasion of Iraq; mostly fought by British troops
 Battle of Basra (2008), an offensive launched against Shi'ite militias during the Iraq War

See also
 Battle of Bosra